MYH can refer to:
An alternative name for MUTYH, a gene that causes colon polyps when mutated.
Muslim Youth Helpline, a charity helpline that provides support for young people in the UK.
 An abbreviation for "million years hence", as a future-looking parallel to the more common mya ("million years ago").
 Myosin heavy chain